Kampong Semabat is a village in Temburong District, Brunei, about  from the district town Bangar. The population was 118 in 2016. It is one of the villages within Mukim Bokok. The postcode is PE4151.

Facilities 
Semabat Primary School is the village's government primary school.

It was built in 1994 and can accommodate 200 worshippers.

References 

Semabat